Si Nan National Park is a national park in Thailand's Nan Province. This mountainous park is home to steep cliffs and a long section of the Nan River. It was established on May 25, 2007.

Geography
The park's area is 640,237 rai ~ . The Nan River flows for about  through the park.

Attractions
Pha Chu, Pha Hua Sing, and Doi Samer Dao offer scenic views of the park's mountainous terrain. Kaeng Luang is a popular rafting spot along the Nan River.

Flora and fauna
The park features forest types including deciduous and mixed. Tree species include Irvingia malayana, krabak, Malabar ironwood, makha, Xylia xylocarpa, Dalbergia oliveri and Vitex pinnata.

Park animals, some of which are endangered species, include tiger, leopard, fishing cat, wild boar, mouse deer, masked palm civet, Asiatic wild dog (dhole) and treeshrew.

See also
List of national parks of Thailand
List of Protected Areas Regional Offices of Thailand

References

National parks of Thailand
Geography of Nan province
Tourist attractions in Nan province